Mohawk Valley Airport IS CLOSED. It is now a cornfield.  was a privately owned, public-use airport located three nautical miles (6 km) northwest of Scotia, a village in the Town of Glenville in Schenectady County, New York, United States.

Facilities and aircraft 
It had one runway designated 15/33 with a turf surface measuring 1,840 by 120 feet (561 x 37 m). For the 12-month period ending September 28, 2007, the airport had 750 aircraft operations, an average of 62 per month: 93% general aviation and 7% military.

The airport closed in 2010.  Entire site is now the Bhatia Farm, LLC.  MP, Haresh Bhatia.

References

External links 
 Aerial image as of 7 May 1995 from USGS The National Map

Defunct airports in New York (state)
Airports in New York (state)
Transportation buildings and structures in Schenectady County, New York
Transportation in Schenectady County, New York